Thomas Ayeko (born 10 February 1992) is a Ugandan professional long-distance runner.  At the 2012 Summer Olympics, he competed in the 10,000 metres, finishing 16th overall.

Career
His international debut came at the 2010 IAAF World Cross Country Championships, where he came 18th and helped Uganda to the junior bronze team medals. His junior career took off the following year as he was the junior silver medallist behind Geoffrey Kamworor at the 2011 IAAF World Cross Country Championships, then won bronze medals in the 5000 metres and 10,000 metres at the 2011 African Junior Athletics Championships. Ayeko stepped into the senior category in 2012 and began to focus on track running, running a 5000 m best of 13:23.25 minutes for second at the Memorial Primo Nebiolo and a 10,000 m best of 27:43.22 minutes in Birmingham.

After his Olympic debut, he began 2013 on grass and won the Antrim Cross Country before taking second at the Cross de San Sebastián. He placed fourth at the Cinque Mulini a month later. He was runner-up to Peter Kibet at that year's Ugandan 10,000 m championship race and went on to place eleventh at the 2013 World Championships in Athletics with a personal best run of 27:40.96 minutes. He made his half marathon debut at the Great Birmingham Run in October and won the race in a time of 1:02:32 hours. A week later, he came in third at the Great South Run 10-miler.

References

External links
 
 PACE sports management profile

1992 births
Living people
Ugandan male long-distance runners
People from Bukwo District
Olympic athletes of Uganda
Athletes (track and field) at the 2012 Summer Olympics
Athletes (track and field) at the 2018 Commonwealth Games
Commonwealth Games competitors for Uganda
20th-century Ugandan people
21st-century Ugandan people